İsmet Kaya Erdem (born 10 September 1928 in Karabük) is a Turkish politician, who served as the Minister of Finance and the Speaker of the Grand National Assembly.

References

1928 births
Living people
People from Karabük
Motherland Party (Turkey) politicians
Ministers of Finance of Turkey
Speakers of the Parliament of Turkey